Club Social y Deportivo Tristán Suárez (or simply Tristán Suárez) is an Argentine sports club from Tristán Suárez, a city in Greater Buenos Aires. The club is mostly known for its football team, which currently plays in Primera B Metropolitana, the third division of the Argentine football league system.

Apart from football, other sports practised at the institution are basketball, women's field hockey, roller skating and taekwondo.

History
The club was founded on 8 August 1929 under the name "Sportivo Tristán Suárez", and began to participate in the football tournaments of Esteban Echeverría and Cañuelas cities from 1931 to 1963, when Tristán Suárez affiliated to Argentine Football Association to participate in the Primera D division. Tristán Suárez debuted officially on 2 May 1964, in the Viejo Gasómetro (San Lorenzo de Almagro old venue) being defeated by now disaffiliated Piraña.

In 1975 Tristán Suárez won its first title, promoting to Primera C. At the end of that season the team (coached by Horacio Harguindeguy) had finishing sharing the first position with Deportivo Merlo so a match between both teams had to be played in order to proclaim a champion. Tristán Suárez finally beat Deportivo Merlo in a penalty shootout after the regular match ended 1–1.

Tristán Suárez debuted on Primera C in 1976, with a 1–1 draw against Deportivo Armenio. In 1994 the team won its second title, the Torneo Apertura, with goalkeeper Alejandro Otamendi playing 1,115 consecutive minutes without conceding a goal, setting a new record. Tristán Suárez later won the Torneo Reducido after defeating Deportivo Paraguayo, Flandria and Berazategui, therefore the team promoted to the upper division, Primera B Metropolitana.

The team debuted on Primera B Metropolitana beating Sportivo Dock Sud. One year later, the team won the 1996 Apertura defeating Colegiales. The club had to play two matches against Defensa y Justicia (1997 Clausura winner) in order to promote to Primera B Nacional but Tristán Suárez lost the series.

In 2004 Tristán Suárez had another chance to promote to Primera B Nacional, but was defeated at the hands of Unión de Santa Fe

Players

Current squad

Titles
Primera D (1): 1975

External links
Official website
Club blog
facebook
twitter
instagram

T
tr
T
T